Abu ol Kheyr (also Romanized as Abū ol Kheyr) is a village in Donbaleh Rud-e Jonubi Rural District, Dehdez District, Izeh County, Khuzestan Province, Iran. At the 2006 census, its population was 287, in 48 families.

References 

Populated places in Izeh County